DWGB (97.1 FM), broadcasting as 97.1 OKFM, is a radio station owned and operated by PBN Broadcasting Network. It serves as the flagship station of the OKFM network. Its studios are located at the 3rd Floor, Bayona Bldg., Imperial Court Subd. Phase 1, Legazpi, Albay, and its transmitter is located at Brgy. Taysan, Legazpi, Albay. It operates monday to saturday from 5AM to 1AM and sunday from 5AM to 12MN.

References

Radio stations in Legazpi, Albay
DWGB